Borutta is a comune (municipality) in the Province of Sassari in the Italian region Sardinia, located about  north of Cagliari and about  southeast of Sassari.

Borutta borders the following municipalities: Bessude, Bonnanaro, Cheremule, Thiesi, Torralba. The volcanic hill once housing the village of Sorres (destroyed by the Aragonese in the early 14th century) houses the Pisan-Romanesque church of San Pietro di Sorres.

References

Cities and towns in Sardinia